The Sailors' Union of the Pacific (SUP), founded on March 6, 1885 in San Francisco, California,
 is an American labor union of mariners, fishermen and boatmen working aboard US flag vessels.

At its fourth meeting in 1885, the fledgling organization adopted the name Coast Sailor's Union and elected George Thompson its first president. Andrew Furuseth, who had joined the union on June 3, 1885 was elected to its highest office in January 1887. In 1889 he returned to sea but was reelected to the position of union secretary in 1891.  It was during this term on July 29, 1891 that Furuseth merged the Coast Seamen's Union with the Steamship Sailor's Union with the new organization named the Sailors' Union of the Pacific.

With the exception of a two-year period when he shipped out as a fisherman, he was secretary of the SUP until 1935.  In 1908, Furuseth also became president of the International Seamen's Union and served in that office until 1938.  During this period, he successfully pushed for legislative reforms that eventually became the Seamen's Act of 1915.

SUP is an affiliate union of Seafarers International Union of North America.  Headquarters are in San Francisco
 and the union has branch offices in Wilmington, California, Seattle, Washington, and Honolulu, Hawaii. SUP also has an office in Norfolk, Virginia.

Union executives 

 George Thompson (1885-1887]
 Andrew Furuseth (January 1887 – 1889)
 Andrew Furuseth (January 1891 – 1935)
 Harry Lundeberg (1939–1957) (Secretary/Treasurer)
 Morris Weisberger (1957–1979) (President/Secretary- Treasurer)
 Paul Dempster (1979–1990) (President/Secretary- Treasurer)
 Gunnar Lundeberg (1990-current) (President/Secretary- Treasurer)

See also

Andrew Furuseth
American Maritime Officers
Seafarers International Union of North America
National Maritime Union
Paul Hall
Michael Sacco
United States Merchant Marine
Sigismund Danielewicz

Notes

References

Archie Green, Harry Lundeberg's Stetson & Other Nautical Treasures (Crockett, CA: Carquinez Press, 2006).

Further reading

External links

Sailor's Union of the Pacific from the Waterfront Workers History Project.

Trade unions established in 1885
Maritime history of the United States
Seafarers' trade unions
Seafarers International Union of North America